Reno and Smiley were an American musical duo that was composed of Don Reno (May 17, 1925 – October 16, 1984) and Red Smiley (February 21, 1925 –  January 2, 1972). They were one of the most acclaimed duos in country and bluegrass music in the 1950s and early 1960s.

Background 
Arthur Lee Smiley, Red Smiley, was born in Marshall, NC. Little is known about his early life, but his musical inspiration is said to have surfaced at the age of seven when seeing two hobos playing in Bushnell, North Carolina. By the late 1930s, he was playing on WROL in Knoxville, Tennessee, with guitar being his primary instrument. In 1942, he joined the Army. After he was discharged, he attended diesel mechanic school in Nashville, Tennessee, where he first saw Don Reno playing on the Grand Ole Opry with Bill Monroe. At this time, he was also performing in East Tennessee and western North Carolina.

Donald Wesley Reno, Don Reno, was born in Spartanburg, SC, but made his home in Clyde, North Carolina. He was known as a showman, vocalist, multi-instrumentalist, songwriter, and composer, although his immediate family was not musical. He was exposed to fiddlers Art Wooten and Tommy Magness through the wife of his older brother Harley, in which she had brothers that had a band. He first picked up the banjo at the age of five and by age eight, he owned a guitar. Reno's musical approach was different than others in bluegrass at the time in that his was more innovative rather than traditional, injecting blues and jazz into his playing. As he wavered between guitar and banjo, he was a star on both. In March 1944, Reno joined the Army and served as company barber in Burma and China. After the war, he operated a grocery store in South Carolina and played jazz and country music at night. In 1948, he heard that Bill Monroe needed a banjo player after Earl Scruggs had left, so he drove to Taylorsville, North Carolina, where he got onstage without invitation and played banjo with Bill Monroe and the Blue Grass Boys. He stayed with them until 1949, when Reno left the Blue Grass Boys because of an occurrence of malaria and formed the first edition of the Tennessee Cut-Ups in South Carolina with his nephew, Verlon Reno.

How they met 
The two talents met in 1949 while working with fiddler Tommy Magness and the Tennessee Buddies in Roanoke, Virginia. Red Smiley was already an active member of the group when Don Reno was called to join them. Smiley also joined the group in 1949, playing at WDBJ radio. After hearing that Reno had left Bill Monroe and the Blue Grass Boys, Smiley convinced Magness to call and offer him a job. The first records that Red and Don recorded together were with Tommy Magness in 1951 for Federal Records, a subsidiary of King Records, recording four Reno-penned sacred songs, where they found that their playing worked well together.

Their career together
After Tommy Magness retired, they both joined Toby Stroud's Blue Mountain Boys  to play on a radio station, WWVA (AM), in Wheeling, West Virginia. In 1952, Syd Nathan from King Records called and offered to record Reno and Smiley alone. The duo recorded "I'm Using My Bible for a Roadmap" in 1952, which was written by Don Reno in 1950. They went their separate ways, Smiley returning to Asheville to work as a mechanic, and Reno re-joining Arthur "Guitar Boogie" Smith and the Crackerjacks in Charlotte, North Carolina.

When a man from Richmond, Virginia wanted to produce a live show with Red and Don on Easter weekend of 1955, the two went to Richmond, along with John Palmer on bass and Mack Magaha on fiddle, and played together on stage for the first time. After playing the Old Dominion Barn Dance the day before, a radio show in Richmond, the group was offered a regular job at the Barn Dance. They accepted and Reno & Smiley and the Tennessee Cut-Ups were formed, recording their first session in August 1956 while releasing a single record every six weeks, with Carlton Haney as their manager.

The group was popular in the southeast and mid-Atlantic, when the duo started the first early morning  country music TV show on December 31, 1956 in Roanoke, Virginia called Top o' the Morning, the show airing every weekday. The show was followed by a Saturday night radio barn dance and a weekly TV show. Due to a heavy TV schedule and the decline in Don Reno's health, their touring schedule was restricted. In November 1964, the group parted ways with Reno keeping the band name and adding his son, Ronnie Reno, on mandolin to work more road dates. The two reunited briefly in 1965 to play a college concert at Temple University in Philadelphia, Pennsylvania. After the split, though, Smiley continued to play on the TV shows as the "Bluegrass Cut-Ups" until Top o' the Morning was cancelled in 1968, which lead him into retirement. When Smiley retired in the late 1960s, Jim Eanes acquired the band, renaming it "The Shenandoah Cutups".

From late 1966 to early 1977, Don Reno traveled with Benny Martin. Red Smiley decided to come out of retirement to join the two and toured with them from 1969-1972. Red Smiley died in 1972 at the age of 47. Don Reno continued to perform with his sons Don Wayne and Dale along, with Bill Harrell, until his death in 1984 at the age of 57.

In 1992, Don Reno and Red Smiley were inducted into the International Bluegrass Music Hall of Honor.

Discography

Singles

Albums

See also
Don Reno
Arthur Lee "Red" Smiley

References

American bluegrass music groups
Country music duos
King Records artists
Musical groups established in 1951
1951 establishments in West Virginia
Musicians from Wheeling, West Virginia